Pereleshinsky is an urban locality (an urban-type settlement) in Paninsky District of Voronezh Oblast, Russia. Population:

References

Urban-type settlements in Voronezh Oblast